Good Morning Sydney is an Australian local morning show which aired on Network Ten in New South Wales only in between 1978 until 1989. It was hosted by Maureen Duval from 1978 to 1988.

References

Network 10 original programming
Australian variety television shows
1978 Australian television series debuts
1989 Australian television series endings
Television shows set in Sydney
English-language television shows